Henry Percival Biggar (Carrying Place, Ontario,  August 9, 1872 — Worplesdon, Surrey, July 25, 1938) was a historian and Canadian archivist. After studies at the Upper Canada College of Toronto, at the University of Toronto and at the University of Oxford, he worked with Archives nationales du Canada and became chief archivist of Canada in Europe from 1905 until his death.

Works
Expert in the history of New France, he wrote The Early Trading Companies of New France (1901), co-edited the first book published by the Champlain Society, Lescarbot’s History of New France (1907), published The Precursors of Jacques Cartier (1911) as well as A Collection of Documents relating to Jacques Cartier and the Sieur de Roberval (1930). He also translated and published The Voyages of Jacques Cartier (1924) and supervised the publication of The Works of Samuel de Champlain (1922–1936).

External links

  Biographical note

1872 births
1938 deaths
Alumni of the University of Oxford
20th-century Canadian historians
Canadian male non-fiction writers